Bolthouse Farms, founded 1915 in Grant, Michigan, is a vertically integrated farm company specializing in refrigerated beverages. It is located in the San Joaquin Valley of California and is headquartered in Bakersfield, California in Kern County. The company operates facilities in Prosser, Washington. Private equity firm Madison Dearborn Partners owned Bolthouse from 2005 to 2012, when it was bought by the Campbell Soup Company for US$1.55 billion. The company changed hands once again in June 2019, when Campbell sold it to Butterfly Equity.

History

The farm was originally a "small muck-soil vegetable farm" until 1938 when William Herman Bolthouse took it over from his parents. At that point he expanded it and began to concentrate on the production and distribution of carrots. Under his leadership, in 1973, opened a second facility in Bakersfield, California, where year-round production was possible. His son William J. took over in 1985 upon his retirement. It stayed in family hands until shortly after the death of William Herman in 2004 at age 89.

Private equity firm Madison Dearborn Partners then owned Bolthouse from 2005 to 2012. It shut down all Michigan operations in June 2010. Campbell Soup Company acquired the company in 2012 for US$1.55 billion. In April 2019, Bolthouse Farms again fell in the hands of a private equity firm when it was bought from Campbell by an affiliate of Butterfly Equity for US$510 million.

In an effort to reduce the costs of preventative safety protocols for COVID-19 infections and to more quickly reach herd immunity within the company, Bolthouse secured vaccine doses from public health officials to be given directly to their workers. The company will give $500 in cash for full time hourly workers who have been vaccinated.

Baby carrots marketing campaign
In September 2010, a marketing initiative was launched by a group of nearly 50 carrot producers led by Bolthouse Farms (calling themselves "A Bunch of Carrot Farmers") sought to promote baby-cut carrots as an alternative to junk food for children. The campaign mimicked tactics typically employed by snack food marketers, including snack-food-like packaging; futuristic, sexual, and extreme sports-themed TV commercials; carrot vending machines in schools; and an iPhone game and website. As of September 2016, the company markets packaged baby-cut carrots with cartoon mascots and spicing shakers under the name "Kids Veggie Snackers," including Carrot Meets Ranch (ranch dressing spices, cowboy carrot mascot) and Carrot Meets Chili Lime (cartoon hot pepper and carrot in romantic pairing).

Carrot hot dogs 
In 2020, Bolthouse Farms first cured and sold carrots to be grilled as carrot hot dogs. The grill-ready carrots are labeled Carrot Dogs and sold in 8 packs. The carrot hot dogs are sold in three flavors: Classic American-Style, Chorizo-Style and Sweet Italian-Style. The company at the same time added carrot fettucine and riced carrots. The products were launched to appeal to consumers' who want more plant-based foods.

Carrot fiber product
In 2003, the U.S. Food and Drug Administration accepted Bolthouse Farms' self-certification that carrot fiber ingredient is generally recognized as safe (GRAS).

2006 health concerns

Carrot botulism outbreak
In September 2006, the Canadian Food Inspection Agency ordered a recall of Bolthouse Farms "100 per cent Carrot Juice" and other Bolthouse Farms products because of several cases of botulism resulting from consumption of the products. On September 29, 2006, the United States Food and Drug Administration (FDA) recommended that Georgia residents not purchase Bolthouse Farms carrot juice and warned consumers not to purchase Bolthouse Farms products stale-dated November 11, 2006, or earlier.

The warning and the recalls were due to reported cases of consumption of the beverages resulting in six cases of botulism in the United States and Canada. Two cases in Toronto, Ontario, Canada resulted in paralysis; three cases recorded in Georgia, United States resulted in respiratory failure, with the  patients requiring ventilators; one case recorded in Florida resulted in hospitalization. The patient in Florida was last reported to be unresponsive since mid-September 2006.

In response, Bolthouse Farms said the people may have failed to properly refrigerate the products. Bolthouse Farms has subsequently released an FAQ regarding the event.

Relationship to the Bolthouse Foundation
The Bolthouse Foundation is a religious charity funding evangelical causes. Mr. and Mrs. William J. Bolthouse sold their interest in Wm. Bolthouse Farms in late 2005, and since then the Bolthouse Foundation has reflected their giving decisions exclusively. The Bolthouse Foundation is a separate entity from Bolthouse Farms, and all funding decisions by The Bolthouse Foundation are made solely by the Bolthouse Foundation. No members of The Bolthouse Foundation have a financial interest in Bolthouse Farms, and The Bolthouse Foundation receives neither financial support nor benefits from the profits of Bolthouse Farms.

The division of Bolthouse Farms and The Bolthouse Foundation became evident in October 2008 when an article in the Los Angeles Times announced that the boycott of Bolthouse Farms had ended. The advocacy group Californians Against Hate (CAH) had urged consumers not to support Bolthouse Farms. On October 9, 2008, CAH campaign manager Fred Karger issued a statement saying that the "Don't Buy Bolthouse" campaign had ended.

References

External links

Food and drink companies established in 1915
Farms in California
Companies based in Bakersfield, California
Newaygo County, Michigan
Madison Dearborn Partners companies
Juice brands
Campbell Soup Company brands
1915 establishments in Michigan